The Leapster Learning Game System is an educational handheld game console aimed at 5 to 10-11 year olds (preschool to fourth grade), made by LeapFrog Enterprises. Its games teach the alphabet, phonics, basic math (addition, subtraction, multiplication, division), and art and animal facts to players. Along with a directional pad, the system features a touchscreen with a stylus pen that enables young users to interact directly with the screen.
LeapFrog released the Leapster2 handheld device as a successor to the Leapster in July 2008. The Leapster2 is essentially the previous system with an added USB port and SD card slot. These additions give the ability to play a downloaded full game or short game including the ability to log data on gameplay, such as what has been learned by the user or art created by the user.  Downloadable games are not for sale.

The games released since the Leapster2's release log user activity and will send this data to LeapFrog's "Learning Path" system, which tracks educational milestones completed. Completion of certain learning activity can allow online games to be accessed. In the case of art created on the device, the art can be further embellished online and printed with a printer accessible by the user's computer. Both the Leapster and Leapster L-MAX were retired in 2014 and the Leapster2 was retired in 2019.

History
Released on October 7, 2003, the Leapster has since undergone several revisions and remakes. The Leapster L-MAX, a version that has one extra feature (an A/V TV output, which allows the user to view and hear gameplay on their television) was released in 2004. The L-MAX console's size has decreased and the pen is now a wire instead of a thread. The Leapster TV, a screenless version with the same basic control layout in a console form, was released in 2005 and retired in 2007.

The Leapster was the best-selling educational handheld game console in America and has sold about 4 million units and 12 million software cartridges since its inception, as of May 2007. It is regularly sold in nine countries directly, and in another 7 for teaching English as a second language in schools.

Software
There are approximately 40 games available, and over 50 have been created. This is the largest library for any handheld designed exclusively for educational use.

All games for the Leapster feature a "Hint" function along with a dedicated "Hint" button that will bring up audio or animated information on instructions given in the game.

LeapFrog has not opened the Leapster platform to significant amounts of third-party or homebrew development; software is typically developed in-house or as work-for-hire.

Criticism
Dave Bauer stated that there is a "depressingly small library of software available for the Leapster ... but some more varied software would make it much more interesting for (my son) ... no platform that has ever been successful without third-party software. ... Besides that, a strong hobbyist platform would be amazing".

Ian Bogost stated "the potential for improved educational game design is simply not going to come from inside the LeapFrog corporation".

Games licensed

1st Grade
2nd Grade: Musical Menace
Adibou: À la Recherche de Robilloc
Animal Genius
The Backyardigans
The Batman: Multiply, Divide and Conquer
The Batman: Strength in Numbers
Bratz World: The Jet Set
Cars
Cars 2
Cars Supercharged
Clifford the Big Red Dog: Reading
Cosmic Math
Crayola: Art Adventure
Creature Create
Digging for Dinosaurs
The Disney•PIXAR Collection
Disney Fairies
Disney Princess: Enchanted Learning
Disney Princess: Worlds of Enchantment
Dora the Explorer: Camping Adventure
Dora the Explorer: Piñata Party
Dora the Explorer: Wildlife Rescue
Finding Nemo
Foster's Home for Imaginary Friends
Get Puzzled!
Go, Diego, Go!: Animal Rescuer
I Spy: Challenger! 
I Spy: Treasure Hunt 
The Incredibles
Junie B. Jones Top-Secret Personal Beeswax Journal
Kindergarten
Learning with Leap (cartridge-only game, built in on some Leapsters)
Letter Factory
Letters on the Loose
Letterpillar
Madagascar
Math Baseball
Math Missions
Mr. Pencil's Learn to Draw and Write
My Amusement Park
NASCAR
Ni Hao, Kai-Lan: Beach Day
Noddy: Rainbow Adventures (UK only)
Number Raiders
Numbers on the Run: Counting on Zero
Outwit!
The Penguins of Madagascar: Race for 1st Place!
Pet Pals
Phonics: Lesson One
The Princess and the Frog
Ratatouille
Reading with Phonics: Mole's Huge Nose
Rock the World: A Reading Adventure
Schoolhouse Rock!: America Rock
Schoolhouse Rock!: Grammar Rock
Scooby-Doo!: Math Times Two
Scooby-Doo!: Spooky Snacks
Sonic X
Spider-Man: The Case of the Sinister Speller
SpongeBob SquarePants: Saves the Day
SpongeBob SquarePants: Through the Wormhole
Star Wars: The Clone Wars - Jedi Math
Star Wars: Jedi Reading
Tangled
The Talking Words Factory
Thomas & Friends: Calling All Engines!
Top-Secret Personal Beeswax: Share a Journal with Junie B.
Toy Story 3
Up
WALL-E
Wolverine and the X-Men
Word Chasers

Technical specifications

Hardware
 CPU: Custom ASIC containing an ARCTangent-A5 CPU, running at 96 MHz.
 Memory: Original Leapster: 2 MB onboard RAM, 256 bytes non-volatile. Leapster2: 16 MB RAM, 128 KB non-volatile storage
 Media type: Cartridges of 4-16 MB with between 2 and 512 KB non-volatile storage.
 Graphics: 4 MB ATI chip.
 Audio: Proprietary hardware audio acceleration, which includes MIDI playback and CELP voice compression sampled at 8000 Hz. 
 It retains the same sound source from the original LeapPad from 1999.
 Screen: 160x160 CSTN with touchscreen.
 Leapster2 only: USB 1.1 (client only) and full-sized SD slot.
 Some Leapster2s have no SD slot and use onboard memory in place of it.

All of the software content for the original Leapster was created with Macromedia Flash MX 2004; the device runs a version of Adobe Flash Player ported to the Leapster, that is licensed to LeapFrog. Tom Prichard, Sr. Vice President of Marketing for Leapfrog, said that he believed using Flash allowed them to "bring the Leapster system to life more rapidly than we could have with any other development method".

References

External links
Official site

Handheld game consoles
Children's educational video games
Products introduced in 2003
Video games developed in the United States
Sixth-generation video game consoles
Products and services discontinued in 2019